Holy Du'ā (archaically transliterated Doowa) is the mandatory Nizari Isma'ili prayer recited three times a day: Fajr prayer at dawn, Maghrib prayer at sundown and Isha prayer in the evening. Each Holy Du'a consists of 6 rakat, totaling 18 per day, as opposed to the 17 of Sunni and Twelver salat (namaz).

Only Nizaris are permitted to enter the prayer house, the Jama'at Khana, during the recitation the Holy Du'a; however, prayers can be performed at home or other places.

Nizārī prayer performed at Jama'at Khana
Jama'at Khanas are usually built with a qibla facing Mecca although Ismāʿīlīs believe that "to God belongs the East and the West" (Quran 2:142).

The Holy Du'a starts with Surah al-Fatiha and then various verses from Surat an-Nisa, al-Ma'ida, al-Fath and al-Anfal are recited and the last part of the rak'ah contains Surah al-Ikhlas. The du'a is performed sitting, with a prostration at the end of each rakah. In Khoja tradition, Ubhi Tasbih is recited during tahajjud. Tasbih (prayer beads) are used at various points during the du'a. Towards the end of the Du'a, a list of all the Imāms is read, beginning with Ali and ending with the current Imam. At the end of the du'a, worshippers turn to their neighbour, saying shah-jo seedar, "may you be blessed with the vision of your Lord". .

The Holy Du'a is recited in Arabic, but it was once common for, Nizaris from India and Pakistan to recite the prayer in the vernacular.

See also 
 History of Nizari Ismailism

References

Shia prayers
Ismaili practices
Salah
Salah terminology